Evan Eckenrode is an American comedian, filmmaker, internet personality and former Vine star. Eckenrode is best known for his work on Vine, and on the video platform YouTube. His other projects included collaborations with his former roommate Logan Paul, and his frequent livestreams on the popular streaming platform Twitch.

When TubeFilter (a website that interviews social media stars) asked Eckenrode about his YouTube fame, he stated "Honestly, it feels surreal thinking about having two million subscribers. It’s the best feeling knowing that I get to share my humour and life with so many people. It is humbling to know that I get to connect with so many fans from all demographics and its something I don’t take for granted."

References

Year of birth missing (living people)
Living people
Vine (service) celebrities
American YouTubers
Video bloggers
Entertainers with dwarfism
Male bloggers
Twitch (service) streamers